Denys Shcherbakov (born 4 June 1988) is a Ukrainian orienteering competitor. He competed at the 2013 World Orienteering Championships, and won a bronze medal in the relay with the Ukrainian team, together with Pavlo Ushkvarok and Oleksandr Kratov.

He was born in Tsurupinsk, but represents the club OK Rönneby in Sweden.

References

External links
 
 

1988 births
Living people
Ukrainian orienteers
Male orienteers
Foot orienteers
World Orienteering Championships medalists